William Howard Plackett (April 4, 1937 – March 4, 2016) was a senior sailor in the United States Navy who served as the sixth Master Chief Petty Officer of the Navy.

Naval career
Plackett's first duty station was with the Naval Control of Shipping Office on Bahrain in the Persian Gulf and earned promotion to petty officer third class. Following that tour, he went back to the schoolhouse for Radioman "B" school and was assigned to Representative, Commander East Force/Naval Control of Shipping Office. He was there during the Six-Day War. In September 1967, just 11 years after joining the navy, he was selected as a chief petty officer. Upon completion of a tour aboard , which included an extended ten-month deployment in the Mediterranean Sea, he served as an instructor at Radioman "B" school in United States Naval Training Center Bainbridge.

Plackett was selected for the associate degree Completion Program in April 1971 and was advanced to senior chief petty officer while attending classes at Pensacola Junior College. He graduated with honors in December 1972 and was awarded an academic scholarship at the University of West Florida.  He graduated magna cum laude with a Bachelor of Science degree in vocational education one year later.

Following a second tour on the Forrestal and his selection as master chief petty officer, he assumed duties as Director of Communications School, Fleet Training Center, Norfolk, Virginia. In 1979, he was named command master chief for Commander, Training Command, United States Atlantic Fleet Headquarters and subsequently was selected as the first Force Master Chief of the Atlantic Fleet Training Command in July 1981. In July 1982, Plackett was selected as Fleet Master Chief, Commander in Chief United States Atlantic Fleet where he served until his selection in July 1985 as the sixth Master Chief Petty Officer of the Navy.

Awards and decorations

 8 gold service stripes.

References

External links
Extensive bio at quarterdeck.org
Career summary from Naval History and Heritage Command

1937 births
2016 deaths
People from Paxton, Illinois
Master Chief Petty Officers of the United States Navy
Recipients of the Navy Distinguished Service Medal
Recipients of the Legion of Merit
Pensacola Junior College alumni
University of West Florida alumni
Recipients of the Meritorious Service Medal (United States)